Rubén David González Gallego (born 1968 in Moscow) is a Russian writer of Spanish ancestry.  

After being born with severe cerebral palsy in the Soviet Union, Gallego was separated from his family at the age of one. He was sent to a state orphanage, because his grandfather, Ignacio Gallego, a Spanish Communist politician (General Secretary of the Spanish Communist Party since 1984), was ashamed of his birth disorder. He later told his daughter, Aurora Gallego Rodríguez (Rubén's mother), that her son had died. 

Born without the use of his hands and feet, Gallego was tenacious and survived to adulthood, eventually marrying and having children. He lived in Russia and worked as a computer specialist until 2001, when he was reunited with his mother in Prague. Gallego lived in Freiburg, Germany, later moved to the United States. He now resides in Israel.

His memoir, about his dreadful childhood in different Soviet orphanages won the Russian Booker Prize. The book was translated into English and published, in January 2006, as White on Black: A Boy's Story. An abridged version of the memoir was read on the Book of the Week programme on BBC Radio 4 in the week of March 20–24, 2006.

The book has also been translated into French (2002 by Aurora Gallego Rodríguez and Joëlle Roche-Parfenov, Actes Sud/Solin), Vietnamese, Swedish (2005 by Ola Wallin, Ersatz), Lithuanian (2005 by Andrius Šiuša), Polish (2005 by Katarzyna Maria Janowska, Wydawnictwo Znak), Finnish (2006 by Teemu Kaskinen, Sammakko), Icelandic (2007 by Helga Brekkan, JPV), Hebrew (2008 by S. Levin), Czech (2009 by Denisa Šťastná, Revolver Revue), Georgian (2009 by Nino Bekishvili), Esperanto (2010 by Kalle Kniivilä), Romanian (2019) by Liliana Radulescu and Nicoleta Silivestru, and Estonian (2020) by Valdek Kiiver.

External links
 From victim to hero – book review published in The Guardian in January 2006.
 
 

 

1968 births
Living people
Spanish-language writers
Russian expatriates in the United States
Russian expatriates in Israel
Russian people of Spanish descent
Russian expatriates in Germany
Writers from Moscow
People with cerebral palsy
Russian Booker Prize winners